Konstantinos Venizelou (born 5 July 2004) is a Cypriot footballer who plays as a midfielder for Omonia.

Honours
Omonia
Cypriot First Division: 2020–21

References

External links

2004 births
Living people
Cypriot footballers
AC Omonia players
Association football midfielders